Styx is a 2018 German-Austrian drama film directed by Wolfgang Fischer. It was screened in the Panorama section at the 68th Berlin International Film Festival.

Plot
Rike is a German emergency doctor. For her holiday she decided to sail alone on her twelve-metre long yacht "Asa Gray", on a trip in the footsteps of Charles Darwin from Gibraltar to Ascension Island in the South Atlantic. During her journey off North Africa, she is informed by a container ship passing nearby that she must prepare for a severe storm on her way.

After the violent storm that night, she discovers a damaged and overloaded trawler near her boat. Containing over a hundred people, threatened with death by drowning, they wave and shout towards her yacht. Rike tries to contact the boat by radio. When she does not receive an answer, she tries to contact rescue teams and organise the rescue. However, the requests for help remain largely unanswered at first, although several vessels can be seen nearby on the onboard radar. Coastguards are warned and promise help, but this will take many hours. The captain of the transport ship, who had promised support before the storm, informs him that his shipping company has prohibited any involvement in the rescue at sea of refugees.

Through her binoculars, Rike notices passengers falling or jumping into the water. A 14-year old boy swims and reaches the yacht. With the help of a lifebuoy, she rescues the exhausted boy from the water and hoists him onto her ship. The boy's name is Kingsley, which is written on his wristband. Rike moves away from the trawler, so as not to provoke further attempts, as her boat is too small to accommodate all the passengers. She gives first aid to Kingsley, bandages his wounds, and puts him on an IV drip. She calls the coastguard again by radio, who promise her that help is on its way and that she must stay away from the refugee boat.

Kingsley, who speaks some English, regains consciousness and tries to pressure Rike to come to the rescue of the trawler on which, among others, her sister is on. He struggles with Rike to get the ignition key to the yacht, even pushing her overboard. After starting the engine and moving somewhat away, Kingsley stops the engine again, and Rike climbs back on deck with difficulty. Shocked by this act, she is furious with Kingsley, but notices his despair and calls the coastguard again, claiming that the "Asa Gray" will sink now. After the SOS, she cuts the ship's electrical system and activates her distress beacon.

The following night, she approaches the trawler, climbs aboard and finds a number of dead and dying people on the ship.
At dawn, the tenders of a Coast Guard frigate shuttle with the abandoned trawler to rescue the survivors and recover the dead, while radio messages about other ships in distress arrive, each with hundreds of refugees on board. Rike is recovered from the frigate. Traumatised and unable to answer the questions of the coastguards who questioned her, she is informed that proceedings were being brought against her.

Cast
 Susanne Wolff as Rieke
 Gedion Wekesa Oduor as Kingsley
 Alexander Beyer as Paul
 Inga Birkenfeld as Marie

Reception

Critical response 
The site's critical consensus reads, "Anchored by powerful work from Susanne Wolff, Styx provocatively depicts mankind at war with itself and the natural world -- and argues our best weapon is compassion."

References

External links
 
 
 
 

2018 films
2018 drama films
German drama films
English-language German films
English-language Austrian films
2010s English-language films
2010s German films